The 2018 Grand National (officially known as the Randox Health 2018 Grand National for sponsorship reasons) was the 171st annual running of the Grand National horse race at Aintree Racecourse near Liverpool, England. The showpiece steeplechase was the pinnacle of  a three-day festival which commenced on 12 April 2018. The event was sponsored by Randox Health for the second time.

The race was won by  shot Tiger Roll, ridden by Davy Russell, in a photo finish from Pleasant Company. All 38 runners returned to the stables, although Saint Are required veterinary attention on the course and Charlie Deutsch, riding Houblon Des Obeaux, was treated on the track after a fall leading to Becher's Brook being bypassed on the second circuit.

Race card 
From an initial 105 entries, the final field of 40 runners was declared on 13 April, after Minella Rocco, Vicente and Beeves were all withdrawn from the race and replaced by Thunder And Roses, Delusionofgrandeur and Walk In The Mill. Two contenders, Regal Encore and Walk In The Mill a day after securing its position in the race, were withdrawn on the morning of the race, leaving 38 starters, the smallest field since 1999.

2018 also marked the first National for 30 years to feature three female jockeys in the line-up. 2012 third-placed jockey Katie Walsh paired Baie Des Iles for her sixth ride in the race, whilst Rachael Blackmore and Bryony Frost were both handed their first National rides on Alpha Des Obeaux and Milansbar respectively.

Great Britain unless stated.
Horses 1 & 12 were late replacements

Race overview 

The first fence claimed Perfect Candidate who in turn brought down one of the favourites, Blaklion. I Just Know led the field until falling at Becher's Brook, which also saw Houblon Des Obleaux and Virgilio out of the race. Houblon Des Obeaux's jockey Charlie Deutsch was treated for injuries at the scene, resulting in Becher's being bypassed on the second circuit. Captain Redbeard unseated its rider at the Foinavon fence as Ucello Conti led the field from Double Ross, with The Dutchman, Milansbar and Pleasant Company also prominent. The Canal Turn saw the end of Lord Windermere, Buywise and Final Nudge. Chase The Spud pulled up before The Chair, which claimed Alpha Des Obeaux and Saint Are.	

Delusionsofgrandeur and Maggio were pulled up at the beginning of the second circuit, and The Dutchman unseated its rider at Foinavon as Pleasant Company took over the lead. Ucello Conti lost its rider three fences from home, while Seeyouatmidnight challenged Pleasant Company for the lead. Tiger Roll made its move and hit the lead on the 29th fence. On the run-in, Pleasant Company fought back and almost caught Tiger Roll, losing by a head.	

There were no fatalities, although Saint Are was treated by veterinarians after being brought down at The Chair. A few days later, Saint Are's retirement from racing was announced. Jockey Charlie Deutsch was kicked in the back by a horse following his fall at Becher's Brook, but recovered and rode a winner at Plumpton the following day.

Finishing order 
Twelve runners completed the course as follows:

 Distance measures from smallest to largest winning margin: nose, short head, head, neck, one length, a distance.

Non-finishers 
The runners who failed to complete were as follows:

Broadcasting and media 

As the Grand National is accorded the status of an event of national interest in the United Kingdom and is listed on the Ofcom Code on Sports and Other Listed and Designated Events, it must be shown on free-to-air terrestrial television in the UK. The race was broadcast live on TV by ITV, in the second year of its four-year deal as the exclusive terrestrial broadcaster of horse racing in the UK.

The coverage was co-anchored by Ed Chamberlin and Francesca Cumani. Analysis was provided by former Grand National winning jockeys Sir Anthony McCoy, Mick Fitzgerald and Ruby Walsh, the latter having been ruled out the Aintree meeting through injury. Reports were provided by Oli Bell, Alice Plunkett and Luke Harvey with updates from the betting ring by Matt Chapman and Brian Gleeson. The commentary team was Mark Johnson, Ian Bartlett and Richard Hoiles.

See also 
Horse racing in Great Britain
List of British National Hunt races

References

External links 

Grand National Beginner's Guide

2018
Grand National
Grand National
21st century in Merseyside
Grand National
Grand